Baroda Assembly constituency is one of the 90 constituencies in the Haryana Legislative Assembly of Haryana a north state of India. Baroda is also part of Sonipat Lok Sabha constituency.

Members of the Legislative Assembly

Election results

2020 Bypoll

See also
 Baroda
 Sonipat district
 List of constituencies of Haryana Legislative Assembly

References

Assembly constituencies of Haryana
Sonipat district